Tenbek is a village in Qatar located in the municipality of Al Daayen.

Nearby settlements include Al Rehayya to the north and Simaisma to the south-east.

History
J.G. Lorimer's Gazetteer of the Persian Gulf records Tenbek (as Tinbak) in 1908, giving its location as 4 miles south Khor Shaqiq and close to the coast. He also stated that the area served as a Bedouin camping ground and accommodated a fort. According to Lorimer, inhabitants received their drinking water from a masonry well sunk into stony ground at a depth of 7 fathoms yielding good water.

Gallery

References

Populated places in Al Daayen